Life in the Twenty-First Century is a Penguin Special book, published in Great Britain in 1960. It features predictions by 29 Soviet scientists concerning technology and science.  It was edited by M Vassilev and S Gouschev.  The English translation was performed by R J Watson and H E Crowcroft.

The original British hardback was published by Souvenir Press in London in the same year as the Penguin edition.

Citation
http://www.worldcat.org/title/life-in-the-twenty-first-century-the-fantastic-world-of-the-immediat-future-as-predicted-by-29-of-russias-leading-scientists/oclc/490906094

1960 non-fiction books
English-language books
Penguin Books books
1960 in the Soviet Union